The Barika or Bhandari (also Known as Baja, Nai, Napita in different area) is an Indian caste found from Odisha State in India. Traditionally they are barbers by profession. Their service is indispensable on the occasion of marriage, birth and death. They are also required for carrying luggage bags of bride and groom in Hindu weddings.

Social Status
Some Barikas of today run and own saloons and beauty parlours.
The Barika (Bhandaris) are included in Other Backward Classes in the State of Odisha.

References

Indian castes
Social groups of Odisha
Barber castes